USCGC Thetis (WMEC-910) is a United States Coast Guard Famous-class medium endurance cutter.  She is the 10th ship of the Famous Class cutters designed and built for the U.S. Coast Guard and the 3rd vessel to bear the name.  Laid down August 24, 1984 by Robert Derecktor Shipyard Incorporated of Middletown, Rhode Island. She was launched April 29, 1986 and named for the Greek goddess Thetis, the mother of Achilles.  She was commissioned on June 30, 1989. Thetis conducts patrols throughout the Caribbean and the Gulf of Mexico.

Her homeport is Key West, Florida

Her duties include law enforcement, search and rescue, homeland security, and national defense. Patrols last anywhere up to two to three months.

As part of Operation Martillo, the Thetis conducted drug interdiction missions in the Eastern Pacific, along the coasts of Central and South America.  Its 68-day patrol netted 15,000 pounds of cocaine and other illegal narcotics.

In December 2021 after visiting Fortaleza in Brazil, the Thetis escorted the new fast response cutters Glen Harris and Emlen Tunnell across the Atlantic Ocean on the way to their assigned homeport of Manama, Bahrain. On January 5, 2022, the three Coast Guard vessels and a Royal Moroccan Navy frigate rescued 103 migrants from two rafts that were taking on water and also recovered two bodies forty miles west of the Moroccan coast.

References

External links

 Thetis home page

Ships of the United States Coast Guard
Famous-class cutters
1986 ships
Ships built in Middletown, Rhode Island